Kendall Sheffield (born May 30, 1996) is an American football cornerback for the Houston Texans of the National Football League (NFL). He played college football at Ohio State, and selected by the Atlanta Falcons in the fourth round in the 2019 NFL Draft.

High school career
Sheffield attended Thurgood Marshall High School in Missouri City, Texas, where he played football and was a high-caliber track athlete. A first-team all-state pick, Sheffield had 39 tackles, three blocked field goals, seven pass break-ups, two interception, three fumble recoveries, two forced fumbles and one touchdown during his senior season for the Buffs.

Track
Also an accomplished track athlete, Sheffield finished second in the 110 metres hurdle at the 2013 UIL Class 4A state championship, behind only Beaumont Ozen's Tony Brown. In 2014, he won the 110-meter high hurdles and the 300-meter intermediate hurdles at the Class 4A state meet, and was named the Gatorade Texas Boys Track & Field Athlete of the Year.

Recruiting
Considered a five-star recruit by ESPN.com, Sheffield was listed as the No. 3 cornerback in the nation in 2015, behind only Iman Marshall and Kevin Toliver.

Sheffield committed to Alabama at the 2015 Under Armour All-America Game. Sheffield arrived at Alabama as a five-star recruit but transferred after his freshman season.

College career
Sheffield redshirted his initial year at Alabama. He decided to transfer to Blinn College, where he spent the 2016 season. In January 2017, Sheffield committed to Ohio State.

Professional career

Atlanta Falcons
Sheffield was drafted by the Atlanta Falcons with the 111th overall pick in the fourth round of the 2019 NFL Draft. In Week 2 against the Philadelphia Eagles, Sheffield recorded his first professional tackle and forced a fumble in the 24–20 win.

On September 8, 2021, Sheffield was placed on injured reserve to start the season. He was activated on October 9.

On May 13, 2022, Sheffield was released by the Falcons.

Houston Texans
On May 17, 2022, Sheffield was claimed off waivers by the Houston Texans. He was waived/injured on August 30 and placed on injured reserve. He was released on October 11, 2022.

Dallas Cowboys
On October 25, 2022, the Dallas Cowboys signed Sheffield to their practice squad. His practice squad contract with the team expired after the season on January 22, 2023.

Houston Texans (second stint)
On March 3, 2023, the Houston Texans signed Sheffield.

Career statistics

References

External links

Ohio State Buckeyes bio

1996 births
Living people
Alabama Crimson Tide football players
American football defensive backs
Atlanta Falcons players
Dallas Cowboys players
Houston Texans players
Ohio State Buckeyes football players
People from Missouri City, Texas
Players of American football from Texas
Sportspeople from Harris County, Texas
Track and field athletes from Texas